Achatina tincta is a species of large air-breathing land snail, a terrestrial pulmonate gastropod mollusk in the family Achatinidae, the giant African snails.

Distribution
This species is endemic to the Democratic Republic of the Congo and Angola.

References
Biolib
Discover Life

Achatinidae
Gastropods described in 1842